"Three Little Birds" is a song by Bob Marley and the Wailers. It is the fourth track on side two of their 1977 album Exodus and was released as a single in 1980. The song reached the Top 20 in the UK, peaking at number 17. It is one of Marley's most popular songs and has been covered by numerous other artists. The song is often thought to be named "Don't Worry About a Thing" or "Every Little Thing is Gonna Be Alright", because of the prominent and repeated use of these phrases in the chorus.

Writing and inspiration
The source of Marley's inspiration for the lyrics of "Three Little Birds" remains disputed. (1)Some people in the industry believe Bob was actually using this as a metaphor for the way they had to grow cannabis! Collecting bird droppings for its nutrients makes one of the best ways to grow top quality cannabis. These land and sea birds both needed to combine droppings to creat this tea can be found flying around the island giving them easy access to the needed resources. (2)They are partly inspired by birds that Marley was fond of that used to fly and sit next to his home. Tony Gilbert, a long time friend of Marley, was present at the time he was writing the song and elaborated, "Bob got inspired by a lot of things around him, he observed life. I remember the three little birds. They were pretty birds, canaries, who would come by the windowsill at Hope Road." However, three female singers from the reggae group I Threes who did shows with Marley claim it is a reference to them. I Threes member Marcia Griffiths remarked, "After the song was written, Bob would always refer to us as the Three Little Birds. After a show, there would be an encore, sometimes people even wanted us to go back onstage four times. Bob would still want to go back and he would say, 'What is my Three Little Birds saying?

The song is written in the key of A major.

Charts

Weekly charts

Certifications

Monty Alexander version

Monty Alexander recorded a cover of "Three Little Birds" in January 1992 and, in 1999, he released it as a hit single. The cover was also produced by him and, unlike the original, the Monty Alexander version is very Jazz-heavy.

Track listings

Ziggy Marley and Sean Paul version

Shark Tale: Motion Picture Soundtrack was released on September 21, 2004 as the soundtrack of Shark Tale. The soundtrack features newly recorded music by various artists, including Christina Aguilera, Mary J. Blige,  Timbaland, The Pussycat Dolls, Ludacris, Missy Elliott, and Justin Timberlake. As part of the album, "Three Little Birds" was covered by Ziggy Marley and Sean Paul

The song was also used in the trailer of the 2007 Sony Pictures Animation film Surf's Up.

Connie Talbot version

"Three Little Birds" was released as the first single by British child singer Connie Talbot on 10 June 2008. It was taken from the 2008 re-release of her 2007 album, Over the Rainbow. Talbot released a music video to publicise the single, which was filmed in Jamaica. The release reached number 3 on the UK Independent Singles Chart, and number 1 on the Billboard Hot Singles Sales chart in the United States.

Background
After rising to fame on the first series of Britain's Got Talent, Talbot signed with Rainbow Recording Company and began production of her debut album, Over the Rainbow. The album initially featured several Christmas themed songs, and the first single, "Over the Rainbow"/"White Christmas", was planned be released on 3 December 2007. The single was then cancelled in favour of an album-first release. The album was rereleased with more general tracks to replace the Christmas songs, and one of the new tracks was a cover of Bob Marley's "Three Little Birds". The songs on the album were chosen with collaboration between Talbot and her management; first Talbot and her family wrote "a list of the songs that Connie would sing at her birthday party", and the management then thought "long and hard" about including the more adult songs, including "I Will Always Love You", but Talbot herself insisted. The album was recorded in a bedroom studio, nicknamed "the hut".

Release and reception
"Three Little Birds" was released as Talbot's first single on 10 June 2008 in the UK, and released alongside the album in the U.S. on 14 October. Rashvin Bedi, writing for Malaysian newspaper The Star, said that "Three Little Birds" was her favourite song on Over the Rainbow. The single peaked at number 3 on the Independent Singles Charts in the United Kingdom, and entered the Billboard Hot Singles Sales chart at number 2, dropping to 3 the next week. It then rose back to number 2, and, on the sixth week, reached number 1. Talbot received attention from the British press because of the single's success, with the Daily Telegraph attributing her success in America to her appeal to the Christian market. As of November 2008, the single has sold more than 250,000 copies worldwide.

Music video
The music video for the single was released on 19 June 2008. It was shot in Jamaica in late March/early April 2008.

The video begins with images of Talbot skipping through a garden, which is then replaced with an image of her singing on a beach. She then joins a child whose parents had been arguing and plays with them and others in a field, then dances with them on the beach. The children are then led to a stage, where Talbot performs as the others sing and play musical instruments. The video closes with Talbot in the garden, skipping away from the camera.

Chart performance

Track listing

Maroon 5 version

American band Maroon 5 collaborated with Hyundai, to record a cover version of "Three Little Birds", that was released as a single on 9 June 2018. It is featured in advertisements for three Hyundai vehicles, namely of the Santa Fe, Kona during 2018 FIFA World Cup and Nexo in the band's official music video.

Music video
A music video was released on 9 June 2018 and was directed by Joseph Kahn.

Release history

References
Footnotes

Bibliography

External links
 Talbot's "Three Little Birds" music video on YouTube

Bob Marley songs
1980 singles
1999 singles
2008 singles
2018 singles
Connie Talbot songs
Maroon 5 songs
Songs written by Bob Marley
Songs about birds
AFC Ajax songs
1977 songs
222 Records singles
Interscope Records singles
Music videos directed by Joseph Kahn